Martin Sjögren (born 27 April 1977) is a Swedish football coach who was most recently head coach of the Norway women's national team.

Career

Damallsvenskan 
He won the 2016 Damallsvenskan title with Linköpings FC.

Norwegian national team 
He agreed to take the Norway national team job in 2016. Upon taking the job, he declared his ambitions to lead Norway to Olympic qualification.

Norway failed to progress past the group stage in the UEFA Women's Euro 2017, finishing last in Group A without scoring a goal.

He led Norway to the quarterfinals of the 2019 FIFA Women's World Cup, finishing second in Group A during the group stages before being defeated 3–0 by England in the quarterfinals. 

The team failed to qualify for the 2020 Summer Olympics.

In 2021, he signed a new contract with the Norwegian national team, with included provisions for a performance review after the 2022 Euros. However, he resigned as Norwegian coach following the UEFA Women's Euro 2022, where Norway failed to progress past the group stage for a second consecutive tournament and suffered an 8–0 loss to England, one of the largest in the tournament's history.

References

External links

 Profile at Linköpings FC 

1977 births
Living people
Swedish footballers
Association football midfielders
University of North Florida alumni
North Florida Ospreys men's soccer players
Swedish football managers
2019 FIFA Women's World Cup managers
UEFA Women's Euro 2022 managers
Norway women's national football team managers
Swedish expatriate football managers
Swedish expatriate sportspeople in Norway
Expatriate football managers in Norway
Swedish expatriate sportspeople in the United States
Expatriate soccer managers in the United States